Pharmaceutics is the discipline of pharmacy that deals with the process of turning a new chemical entity (NCE) or old drugs into a medication to be used safely and effectively by patients.  It is also called the science of dosage form design.  There are many chemicals with pharmacological properties, but need special measures to help them achieve therapeutically relevant amounts at their sites of action. Pharmaceutics helps relate the formulation of drugs to their delivery and disposition in the body.
Pharmaceutics deals with the formulation of a pure drug substance into a dosage form.
Branches of pharmaceutics include:
Pharmaceutical formulation
Pharmaceutical manufacturing
Dispensing pharmacy
Pharmaceutical technology
Physical pharmacy
Pharmaceutical jurisprudence
Pure drug substances are usually white crystalline or amorphous powders. Before the advent of medicine as a science, it was common for pharmacists to dispense drugs as is. Most drugs today are administered as parts of a dosage form. The clinical performance of drugs depends on their form of presentation to the patient.

See also
List of pharmaceutical companies
Pharmacognosy
Pharmaceutical industry
Nicholas Culpeper – 17th-century English physician who translated and used "pharmacological texts"

References

External links

Excipient selection for injectable / parenteral formulations

 
Life sciences industry
Pharmacy